Sat Bir Singh Khalsa is a researcher in the field of body mind medicine, specializing in yoga therapy. Originally from Toronto, he earned his Ph.D. at the University of Toronto, where he also began his practice of Kundalini Yoga under the tutelage of Yogi Bhajan. He is (since 2006) an Associate Professor of Medicine at Harvard Medical School  Sat Bir Singh Khalsa serves as the Director of Yoga Research for Yoga Alliance and the Kundalini Research Institute, Research Associate at the Benson Henry Institute for Mind Body Medicine, and Research Affiliate of the Osher Center for Integrative Medicine.

Research Studies
Sat Bir Singh Khalsa has participated in numerous mind-body studies. His work has been published in more than eighty papers.  He has conducted clinical research trials evaluating yoga interventions for insomnia, post-traumatic stress disorder, chronic stress, and anxiety disorders and in both public school and occupational settings. Sat Bir Singh works with the International Association of Yoga Therapists to promote research on yoga and yoga therapy as the chair of the scientific program committee for the annual Symposium on Yoga Research and as editor-in-chief of the International Journal of Yoga Therapy. He is medical editor of the Harvard Medical School Special Report, An Introduction to Yoga and chief editor of the medical textbook The Principles and Practice of Yoga in Health Care (2016).

Sat Bir Singh Khalsa's papers explore the application of yoga as therapy for mental health conditions, including insomnia, performance anxiety, drug addiction, depression, and as a predictor of low body mass and low medication usage.

Media and Public Speaking
Sat Bir Singh Khalsa is often hired to speak about his research world wide, to share his research findings with the general public, government and NGOs, schools, universities and corporations alike.

General Publication
 Sat Bir Singh Khalsa. (2009). "Kundalini Yoga as Therapy: A Research Perspective," chapter in Kundalini Rising: Exploring the Awakening of Kundalini. Boulder Colorado, Sounds True, Inc.

Link to Research Articles

External links
Brigham and Women's Hospital
International Association of Yoga Therapists
Kundalini Research Institute

1951 births
American Sikhs
Converts to Sikhism
Living people
Sleep researchers
University of Toronto alumni
American yoga teachers
Canadian Sikhs
American people of Canadian descent